Peter Rolfe Vaughan ACGI, DIC, FREng, FICE, FCGI, MASCE, FGS, (born 10 March 1935; died 16 May 2008) was Emeritus Professor of Ground Engineering in the Geotechnics department of Imperial College London.

Biography

Vaughan was born in Limbury near Luton, Bedfordshire in the UK on 10 March 1935, the son of Ernest Alfred Vaughan, a civil servant, and Clarise Marjory Ward, a school teacher, and was educated at Luton Grammar School before going on to do a BSc at Imperial College. He played rugby for his school, the college and for the Luton Grammar School old boys team. 
 
He graduated in 1956 and went to work for two years for Sandeman Kennard & Partners as an assistant engineer on the design of various dams in the north of England before returning to Imperial to do a diploma course in Soil Mechanics.  He received his PhD in 1963 at Imperial College for his research on the instrumentation of earthworks (thesis title Field measurements in earth dams under the supervision of Alan W. Bishop) before going to work in Africa in 1964, where he was supervising engineer on the construction of the embankments of the Kainji Dam in Nigeria.

He continued to mix working in the academic environment of Imperial College with working on engineering projects in the real world for his entire career. He was project engineer for Cow Green Embankment Dam and the Balderhead Dam in the late sixties and lecturer, senior lecturer then reader in the Soil Mechanics Section of Imperial College in the seventies and eighties, becoming Professor of Ground Engineering in 1987 and emeritus professor on his retirement in 1996. During this time he carried out extensive research in subjects such as the properties of weak rocks, stiff clays, residual and other structured soils.  He was an internationally recognised expert in the design and deterioration of earthworks and fills, embankment dams and natural or man-made slopes.  His expertise also included seepage, residual strength and pore pressure measurement and its interpretation. His academic post at Imperial included supervising more than twenty PhD programmes and publishing some 80 papers on technical subjects. He was also an acclaimed and amusing lecturer, having given numerous lectures to international conferences and the Rankine Lecture to the British Geotechnical Association in 1994.  An example of his style is given in an article published in the Guardian on Wednesday 1 February 2006:

"Much seems to depend on words; many people seem to think "reservoir" a rather unpleasant one, and Hattersley admits that he was one. My advice to any reservoir promoter is never say "reservoir", say "lake". Even better, say "wetland habitat". Better still, promote it as a leisure amenity. ("There will be bird watching, cycling, fishing, picnicking, sailing and walking and you can get it all for free if we sometimes sell some of the water to the local water undertaking.") If all else fails, ask for some extra land beside it, cut the grass short, plant 18 little flags and call it a "lateral water hazard"."

Peter Vaughan was an active consultant throughout his career. One of the founding members of Geotechnical Consulting Group he gave specialist advice to consulting firms, contractors, utilities and public authorities on a wide range of problems, such as the reconstruction of Carsington Dam after its failure during construction, and Roadford Dam, where he was a member of the Advisory Panel. He was involved with a review of dam performance for Ardleigh Dam, Essex, a safety review for Mica Dam, Canada, and the rehabilitation of the three dams of the Cascade of Dauga in Latvia for which he was a member of the Advisory Panel. He was involved extensively with the rehabilitation of old clay embankments for London Underground Limited.

He travelled widely on both consultancy work and giving lectures to international engineering bodies. His spare time was taken up with fly fishing and enjoying fine wines, good food and better company.  A very generous associate, colleague or friend, he never married and he died of a heart attack at his home in Suffolk on 16 May 2008.

Academic qualifications
 1956: BSc (Eng) ACGI, Imperial College, London
 1965: PhD, DIC University of London
 1991: DSc, University of London

Professional qualifications
 1991: Fellow, Royal Academy of Engineering
 1978: Fellow, Institution of Civil Engineers
 1970–1973, 1977–1980, 1981–1984: British National Committee on Large Dams
 1971–1974, 1975–1977: British Geotechnical Society Committee
 1975–1977: Geotechnique Advisory Panel
 1972–1973: Organising Committee, British Geotechnical Society Symposium on Field Instrumentation
 1975–1977: Chairman, Organising Committee, Institution of Civil Engineers Symposium on Clay Fills
 1977–1980: Chairman, Organising Sub-Committee, Technical Sessions & Papers, 7th European Conf. Soil Mech. & Foundation

Engineering 
 1981–1984: ICOLD Sub-Committee Materials – Drafting Guide on Geotextiles in Dams
 1986–1988: Working Party on Tropical Residual Soils, Geological Society of London
 1989–1997: Technical Committee on Tropical Soils, ISSMFE
 1994–2008: Technical Committee on Tailings Dams ISSMFE

Prizes
 1956 – Unwin Medal, Imperial College
 1959 – Unwin Postgraduate Prize, Imperial College
 1962 – Trevithick Premium, Institution of Civil Engineers
 1986, 1991, 1998 – Telford Gold Medal, Institution of Civil Engineers
 1992, 1997: Telford Premium, Institution of Civil Engineers
 1994 – Cooper Hill Memorial Prize, Institution of Civil Engineers
 2001 – Geotechnical Research Medal, Institution of Civil Engineers
 1964, 1973, 1997 – British Geotechnical Society Prize
 1994 – Fellow of the City and Guilds of London Institute

Major published works

References

Academics of Imperial College London
English civil engineers
1935 births
2008 deaths
Fellows of the Royal Academy of Engineering
Alumni of Imperial College London
Alumni of the University of London
Rankine Lecturers
People from Luton